Tol is a Dutch surname. Its origin may be patronymic or occupational (from "tollenaar", a tax or toll collector). It is very common in the town of Volendam in North Holland People with this name include:

 Anthony Tol (1943–2014), Dutch philosopher and archivist
 Dick Tol (1934–1973), Dutch football striker 
 Kees Tol (born 1987), Dutch football striker, nephew of Pier
 Leon Tol (born 1987), Dutch football defender 
 Nick Tol (born 1989), Dutch football midfielder, son of Pier
 Pier Tol (born 1958), Dutch football forward
 Richard Tol (born 1969), Dutch climate economist
 Sonja Tol (born 1972), Dutch épée fencer.

See also

Tola (name)
Van Tol, Dutch surname
  (1848–1923), Russian count, civilian governor of St. Petersburg 1889–1903

References

Dutch-language surnames